Grimesland Plantation is a historic plantation house located near Grimesland, Pitt County, North Carolina.  It was built about 1790, and is a two-story, frame dwelling sheathed in weatherboard and with flanking exterior gable end brick chimneys.  It has Greek Revival period flanking one-story, hip roofed wings, a two-story rear addition, and one-story front verandah. Also on the property are a row of frame slave quarters and a stone smokehouse. It was the home of Confederate army general officer Bryan Grimes (1828-1880).

It was added to the National Register of Historic Places in 1971.

References

Plantation houses in North Carolina
Houses on the National Register of Historic Places in North Carolina
Houses completed in 1790
Houses in Pitt County, North Carolina
National Register of Historic Places in Pitt County, North Carolina
Slave cabins and quarters in the United States